Neural precursor cell expressed, developmentally down-regulated 1, also known as Nedd1, is a human gene
and encodes the protein NEDD1.

NEDD1 is localized in the centrosome and it plays a role in mitosis through its interaction with γ-tubulin. WD40 repeats are located in the amino-terminal of the protein and are responsible for NEDD1 localization in the centrosome, and the carboxy-terminal amino acids are needed for interactions with γ-tubulin. Depletion of NEDD1 causes impaired centrosome and chromatin microtubules assembly that results in the failure of microtubule nucleation and prevents proper spindle formation.

References

Further reading

Human proteins